Sport 7 was a Dutch commercial television channel of the KNVB for the broadcasting of live football. John de Mol Jr., Philips, KPN, De Telegraaf and Nuon were shareholders. The channel didn't attract many viewers. Some cable companies refused to add Sport 7. Moreover, the audience had little interest in watching football on Sport 7 because the highlights of the Eredivisie were still being broadcast through public broadcaster NOS. The channel closed within 4 months after launch, on 8 December 1996.

References

Television channels and stations established in 1996
Television channels and stations disestablished in 1996
1996 establishments in the Netherlands
1996 disestablishments in the Netherlands
Defunct television channels in the Netherlands